John Jones (August 25, 1841 – August 15, 1907) was a United States Navy sailor and a recipient of America's highest military decoration — the Medal of Honor — for his actions in the American Civil War.

Biography

Jones later reached the rank of Ordinary Seaman. He is buried in an unmarked grave in St. Mary's Cemetery, Portsmouth, New Hampshire.

Medal of Honor citation
Landsman Jones' official Medal of Honor citation reads:

Served on board the U.S.S. Rhode Island, which was engaged in saving the lives of the officers and crew of the Monitor, 30 December 1862. Participating in the hazardous rescue of the officers and crew of the sinking Monitor, Jones, after rescuing several of the men, became separated in a heavy gale with other members of the cutter that had set out from the Rhode Island, and spent many hours in the small boat at the mercy of the weather and high seas until finally picked up by a schooner 50 miles east of Cape Hatteras

See also

List of American Civil War Medal of Honor recipients: G–L

References

Medal of Honor recipients, 1863-1994. Two volumes. Compiled by George Lang, Raymond L. Collins, and Gerard F. White. New York: Facts on File, 1995. Use the alphabetical Index, which begins on page 865, to locate biographies.

1841 births
1907 deaths
United States Navy Medal of Honor recipients
Union Navy sailors
American Civil War recipients of the Medal of Honor
Military personnel from Connecticut